The 1992 Italian motorcycle Grand Prix was the fifth race of the 1992 Grand Prix motorcycle racing season. It took place on the weekend of 22–24 May 1992 at the Mugello Circuit.

500 cc race report
Wayne Gardner, back from injuries, crashed in practice and missed the race. Mick Doohan got the lead at the start and it became a 3-man battle between him, Kevin Schwantz and Wayne Rainey.
Rainey crashed out; Doohan, got dropped by Schwantz, almost crashed too.

500 cc classification

References

Italian motorcycle Grand Prix
Italian
Motorcycle